Xanthaciura insecta is a species of tephritid or fruit flies in the genus Xanthaciura of the family Tephritidae.

Distribution
United States, Mexico, South to Venezuela, West Indies.

References

Tephritinae
Insects described in 1862
Diptera of South America
Diptera of North America